Kenwood House (also known as the Iveagh Bequest) is a former stately home in Hampstead, London, on the northern boundary of Hampstead Heath. The house was originally constructed in the 17th century and served as a residence for the Earls of Mansfield during the 18th and 19th centuries.

The house and part of the grounds were bought from the 6th Earl of Mansfield in 1925 by Edward Guinness, 1st Earl of Iveagh, and donated to the nation in 1927. The entire estate came under ownership of the London County Council and was open to the public by the end of the 1920s. It remains a popular local tourist attraction.

Location
The house is at the north edge of Hampstead Heath, to the south of Hampstead Lane (the B519). It is in the London Borough of Camden, just south of its boundary with the London Borough of Haringey.

History

Early history
The original house on the property was presumed to have been built around 1616 by the King's Printer, John Bill, and was known as Caen Wood House. It was acquired in 1694 by the Surveyor-General of the Ordnance, William Bridges, who demolished the house and rebuilt it; the original brick structure remains intact under the facade added in the 18th century. The orangery was added in about 1700. Bridges sold the house in 1704, and it went under several owners until 1754, when it was bought by the future Earl of Mansfield, William Murray.

Mansfield family

In 1764, Murray commissioned Robert Adam to remodel the house. Adam was given complete freedom to design it as he chose. He added the library, one of his most famous interiors, to balance the orangery, and accommodate Lord Mansfield's extensive book collection. He also designed the Ionic portico at the entrance. In 1780, the house became a permanent residence.

On Wednesday 7 June 1780, Kenwood was ransacked and partially destroyed during the Gordon Riots. The Earl and Countess fled, while the rioters stole food and drink from the house, and destroyed mirrors, paintings and furniture.

Following the earl's death in 1793, ownership passed to his nephew David Murray, 2nd Earl of Mansfield. He commissioned an extension of the property, initially by Robert Nasmith, then by George Saunders. Saunders added two wings on the north side, along with the offices, kitchen buildings and brewery (now the restaurant) to the side. A dairy was added at this time to supply Kenwood House with milk and cheese. The main Hampstead–Highgate road was moved to the north between 1793 and 1796 so that it would not run directly alongside the property.

The 2nd Earl died in 1796, and ownership passed to his son, David William Murray, 3rd Earl of Mansfield. William Atkinson made several alterations to the property between 1803 and 1839. The property remained part of the Mansfield estate throughout the rest of the century,  but the Mansfields preferred to live at their Scottish estate, Scone Palace.

The 6th Earl of Mansfield, Alan David Murray, inherited Kenwood from his brother in 1906, but soon decided to sell it. First he leased it, and after two years of negotiations, the house was leased in 1910 to the exiled Grand Duke Michael Mikhailovich of Russia and his morganatic wife, Countess Sophie of Merenberg.   In 1914 the couple hosted a dinner and ball attended by European royalty including King George V and Queen Mary.  Michael stayed at Kenwood until 1917, followed by American millionairess Nancy Leeds who moved out in 1920. In 1922 Lord Mansfield sold off the contents of the house and its future was uncertain.

Modern history
Part of the grounds were bought by the Kenwood Preservation Council in 1922, after there had been threats that it would be sold to a building syndicate. This land came under control of the London County Council in 1924 and was opened to the public the following year by King George V. Lord Iveagh, a rich Anglo-Irish businessman and philanthropist of the Guinness family, bought the house and the remaining  not under public ownership from the Mansfield family in 1925 and left it to the nation upon his death in 1927; it was opened to the public the following year. Since then some furniture sold in 1922 has since been bought back. The paintings are from Iveagh's collection.

Kenwood House was closed at the start of World War II. Following the war, the house came under ownership of the London County Council, and it re-opened in 1950. The late 18th-century extensions by Saunders were restored from 1955 to 1959. Ownership transferred to the Greater London Council (GLC) in 1965; following the GLC's demise in 1986, English Heritage took over responsibility for the estate.

The house was closed for major renovations from 2012 until late 2013, partly funded by the Heritage Lottery Fund. This included repairing the Westmorland slate roof, redisplaying the Iveagh Bequest paintings in the south of the house, and redecorating the structure to closer resemble Adam's original design.

In 2019, 134,238 people visited the house.

Estate

There are two drives leading to the house from Hampstead Lane. Each has a gated white-brick lodge. The north, or main entrance front of the house was designed by Robert Adam and is set in Stucco with a central portico. The south front is constructed out of a single Stucco block. It was restored to its original design in 1975. To the east of the house is the service wing, constructed from London stock brick. Opposite this is the brick house, designed as a cold-plunge bath.

The estate has a designed landscape with gardens near the house, probably originally designed by Humphry Repton, contrasting with some surrounding woodland, and the naturalistic Hampstead Heath to the south. There is also a garden designed by Arabella Lennox-Boyd.

The estate is Grade II* listed on the Register of Historic Parks and Gardens.
One third of the estate is a Site of Special Scientific Interest, particularly the ancient woodlands. These are home to many birds and insects and the largest Pipistrelle bat roost in London.

There are sculptures by Barbara Hepworth, Henry Moore and Eugène Dodeigne in the gardens near the house.

Music concerts, originally classical but in more recent years predominantly pop concerts, were held by the lake on Saturday evenings every summer from 1951 until 2006, attracting thousands of people to picnic and enjoy the music, scenery and spectacular fireworks. In February 2007, English Heritage decided to abandon these concerts owing to restrictions placed on them after protests from some local residents. On 19 March 2008, it was announced that the concerts would return to a new location on the Pasture Ground within the Kenwood Estate, with the number of concerts limited to eight per season.

Art

Kenwood House contains a significant number of historic paintings and other works of art, including 63 Old Master paintings. Paintings of note include
 The Guitar Player by Johannes Vermeer
 Self Portrait with Two Circles, a late Rembrandt self-portrait
 Portrait of Pieter van den Broecke, by Frans Hals
 Thomas Gainsborough, 'Portrait of Countess Howe' (wife of Richard Howe, 1st Earl Howe)
 Edwin Henry Landseer, 'Hunting in the Olden Times'
Other painters include
 Joshua Reynolds, 'The Hon'ble Mrs Tollemache as Miranda'
 Angelica Kauffman
 John Crome
 Claude de Jongh
 George Morland
 Anthony van Dyck
 William Larkin
 J. M. W. Turner
 Arthur Boyd Houghton
 François Boucher
 Thomas Lawrence, 'Miss Murray'
 Henry Raeburn
 George Romney
 Jan Baptist Weenix
 Joseph Wright of Derby

Most of the works were acquired by Iveagh in the 1880s–1890s and are mainly Old Master portraits, landscapes and 17th century Dutch and Flemish works and British artists. Others were not part of the Iveagh Bequest but were added to the collection after his death because of a connection with Kenwood House.

There is also a collection of shoe buckles, jewellery and portrait miniatures.

In 2002, a selection of the Suffolk Collection of Stuart portraits was moved to Kenwood from Ranger's House, Greenwich.

In 2012, an exhibition of works from the art collection, Rembrandt, Van Dyck, Gainsborough: The Treasures of Kenwood House, London began a tour of museums in the United States while Kenwood House was undergoing renovations; many of the works had never been outside Britain. The exhibit opened 6 June 2013 in Little Rock, Arkansas at the Arkansas Arts Center.

Cultural references
The house was the subject of a Margaret Calkin James poster in the 1930s, seen by many commuters on the London Underground.

The 1999 British feature film Notting Hill had a scene filmed here.

The 1995 British feature film Sense and Sensibility had scenes filmed here.

Many scenes in the 2013 film Belle, in which William Murray figures as a character, are set in the house or its grounds, although filmed elsewhere.

A scene from the 2016 novel Swing Time by Zadie Smith is set on the grounds of the estate.

References
Citations

Sources

 
 The Buildings of England London 4: North. Bridget Cherry and Nikolaus Pevsner. .
 Kenwood: The Iveagh Bequest. Julius Bryant. (English Heritage publication).
 George III. Andrew Roberts. (2021) Allen Lane. .

External links 

 English Heritage website for the house
 'The Iconic Art of Kenwood House' on Google Arts & Culture
 

Houses in Hampstead
Art museums and galleries in London
Gardens in London
Country houses in London
Historic house museums in London
Museums in the London Borough of Camden
English Heritage sites in London
Grade I listed houses in London
Grade I listed buildings in the London Borough of Camden
Grade I listed museum buildings
 
Former private collections in the United Kingdom
Clan Murray
Georgian architecture in the London Borough of Camden
Neoclassical architecture in London
Grade II* listed parks and gardens in London
Buildings and structures in Hampstead Heath